Streptanthus is a genus of plants within the family Brassicaceae.  There are about 35 known species within the genus Streptanthus, distributed mostly throughout western North America. The common names for this genus are twistflower and jewelflower. Twenty-four of the species and eleven lesser taxa occur in California, thirty-two of which are California endemics; seventeen of these California taxa are classified as rare plants.

Species or subspecies
The following are some of the species (or subspecies) of the genus Streptanthus (county locations are not intended to be exhaustive):
Streptanthus albidus, Metcalf Canyon jewelflower
Streptanthus albidus albidus, Metcalf Canyon jewelflower (Santa Clara County, California), endangered
Streptanthus albidus peramoenus, Uncommon jewelflower, most beautiful jewelflower (Santa Clara County, California)
Streptanthus barbatus, Pacific jewelflower
Streptanthus barbiger, Bearded jewelflower
Streptanthus batrachopus, Mt. Tamalpais jewelflower
Streptanthus bernardinus, Laguna Mountain jewelflower
Streptanthus brachiatus, Socrates Mine jewelflower
Streptanthus bracteatus, Bracted twistflower
Streptanthus breweri, Brewer's jewelflower
Streptanthus callistus, Mt. Hamilton jewelflower
Streptanthus campestris, Southern jewelflower
Streptanthus carinatus, Lyreleaf jewelflower
Streptanthus cordatus, Heartleaf twistflower
Streptanthus diversifolius, Variableleaf jewelflower
Streptanthus drepanoides, Sicklefruit jewelflower
Streptanthus farnsworthianus, Farnsworth's jewelflower
Streptanthus fenestratus, Tehipite Valley jewelflower (Fresno County, California)
Streptanthus glandulosus, Bristly jewelflower, common jewelflower (Mendocino County to San Luis Obispo County, California)
Streptanthus gracilis, Alpine jewelflower
Streptanthus hispidus, Mt. Diablo jewelflower (Contra Costa County, California)
Streptanthus howellii, Howell's jewelflower
Streptanthus hyacinthoides, Sandhill twistflower (Texas, Arkansas, Louisiana, Oklahoma, Nebraska)
Streptanthus insignis, Plumed jewelflower
Streptanthus longisiliquus, Longfruit jewelflower
Streptanthus maculatus, Clasping jewelflower, type species, (Arkansas, Oklahoma, Texas)
Streptanthus morrisonii, Morrison's jewelflower 
Streptanthus niger, Tiburon jewelflower  (Marin County, California), endangered
Streptanthus oliganthus, Masonic Mountain jewelflower
Streptanthus polygaloides, Milkwort jewelflower
Streptanthus tortuosus, Mountain jewelflower, shieldplant
Streptanthus vernalis, Early jewelflower

References

External links
Jepson Manual Treatment

 
Brassicaceae genera